Sir Robert Dormer of Wing, 1st Baronet, 1st Baron Dormer of Wing [or Wenge] (26 January 1551 – 8 November 1616) was a 17th-century English peer.

Life
Dormer was the only surviving son of Sir William Dormer and his second wife, Dorothy Pelham (née Catesby). He studied at Gray's Inn in 1567 and obtained a B.A. from Oxford University in 1569.

In 1575, Dormer succeeded to the considerable lands and estate of his father in Buckinghamshire and elsewhere, together with a fortune estimated by the Spanish ambassador to amount to 100,000 ducats. Dormer became a Justice of the Peace in 1577. He served as High Sheriff of Buckinghamshire in 1584 and was knighted in 1591. He was returned as Member of Parliament for Tregony in 1571 and for Buckinghamshire in 1593.

In June 1615, he was created a baronet, of Wing (or Wenge). Only a few weeks later he was raised to the peerage as Baron Dormer, of Wing [or Wenge]  in the County of Buckingham.

Family
Dormer married Elizabeth Browne, daughter of Anthony Browne, 1st Viscount Montagu, by whom he had six sons and three daughters. Dormer was a brother-in-law of Henry Wriothesley, 2nd Earl of Southampton, who was married to Elizabeth's sister, Mary. His half-sister, Jane, married the Spanish Ambassador, Gómez Suárez de Figueroa y Córdoba, 1st Duke of Feria.

His paternal grandmother, Jane Newdigate, was the sister of the Carthusian martyr, Sebastian Newdigate, but both Dormer and his father appear to have conformed to the established church. Nonetheless, Dormer held strong Catholic sympathies as so many of his relatives remained Catholic. Sir William Dormer was a friend of the influential Francis Russell, 2nd Earl of Bedford, whose patronage seems to have extended to William's son, Robert, and shielded the family somewhat from close scrutiny under the Penal laws despite the fact that Robert had married into the Catholic Montague family.

His daughter, Dorothy, married Sir Henry Huddleston, of Sawston Hall, noted for a number of priest holes.

Death
Lord Dormer died on 18 November 1616, aged 65, and was interred at All Saints' Church, Wing, where there is an impressive monument to his memory. He was succeeded in his titles by his grandson Robert, who was created Earl of Carnarvon in 1628.

References

Sources
 Kidd, Charles, Williamson, David (editors). Debrett's Peerage and Baronetage (1990 edition). New York: St Martin's Press, 1990,

External links
 Burial record, findagrave.com. Accessed 3 January 2023.

1551 births
1616 deaths
01
High Sheriffs of Buckinghamshire
17th-century English nobility
English MPs 1571
English MPs 1593
English knights
English justices of the peace
Members of the pre-1707 English Parliament for constituencies in Cornwall
16th-century English nobility